Horning is a German language surname. Like the related Hörning and Hornung it may either be derived from the term hornung and in this case be used as a nickname for someone with a relationship to the month of February or derived from Middle Low German hornink and then used for a person born out of wedlock (horns as symbols of cuckoldry) or a topographic name referring to the hornlike shape of a property.Notable people with the surname include:
Al Horning (born 1939), Canadian politician
Jim Horning (1942–2013), American computer scientist
Karen Horning (born 1966), former Peruvian swimmer
Marjorie G. Horning (born 1917), American biochemist and pharmacologist
Ross Horning (1920–2005), American historian
Steamer Horning (1892–1982), American football player
William A. Horning (1904–1959), American art director

References 

German-language surnames
Surnames from nicknames
German toponymic surnames